"(I've Had) The Time of My Life" is a 1987 song composed by Franke Previte, John DeNicola, and Donald Markowitz. It was recorded by Bill Medley and Jennifer Warnes, and used as the theme song for the 1987 film Dirty Dancing.  The song has won a number of awards, including the Academy Award for Best Original Song, the Golden Globe Award for Best Original Song, and the Grammy Award for Best Pop Performance by a Duo or Group with Vocals.

History
Singer-songwriter Previte was the lead singer of the band Franke and the Knockouts. He had success with the song "Sweetheart" in 1981, but by 1986 was without a recording contract. In late 1986 or early 1987, producer and head of Millennium Records, Jimmy Ienner, asked Previte about writing some music for "a little movie called Dirty Dancing". Previte initially turned the request down because he was still trying to get a record deal, and he thought the film was a pornographic film based on the title, but Ienner was persistent, declaring that it would "change his life", and got Previte to write several songs for the film, including "Hungry Eyes", later recorded by singer Eric Carmen, which also became a top 10 hit.

Previte wrote the lyrics, and the music was written by John DeNicola and Don Markowitz. He compared writing the song to the writing process of "MacArthur Park". The title was conceived at random while he was traveling down the Garden State Parkway. He suggested that Ienner's pleading inspired the lyric. After getting further approval, Previte, along with DeNicola and Markowitz, created a demo of the song, performing on it himself, along with singer Rachele Cappelli. The demo showcased how the harmonies were to be used, employing a "cold open", or a slow build-up of the song to its finale. 

A song by Lionel Richie was initially planned to be used as the finale of Dirty Dancing, but choreographer Kenny Ortega and his assistant Miranda Garrison (who also played Vivian in the film) selected "The Time of My Life" instead. This demo wasn't used in the final cut of the film − the more polished version with Warnes and Medley was. However, because the Warnes/Medley track was not ready by the time the finale was filmed (it was shot first, due to the tight budget), Previte and Capelli's much lighter and more youthful version was used as a backing track, so that the actors, Patrick Swayze and Jennifer Grey, and the dancers, could have something to dance to. (Swayze later remarked that it was his favorite version, even including all the subsequent remakes.) The demo version finally appeared on the 1998 CD reissue of Previte's 1981 album Franke and the Knockouts, but is only listed as a "Bonus Track".

The movie's writer, Eleanor Bergstein, wanted a famous 1960s singer to perform it to blend then-contemporary musical elements with the aesthetics of the period. The song was initially intended for Donna Summer and Joe Esposito, but Summer turned it down because she did not like the title of the film. Afterwards, producer Michael Lloyd approached Daryl Hall of Hall & Oates and singer-songwriter Kim Carnes to perform; they declined as well. In response, Bill Medley of the Righteous Brothers was approached by Jimmy Ienner repeatedly over two months to do the recording, but he also turned it down because his daughter McKenna was due to be born, and he had promised his wife he would be there. He was also concerned about appearing in another song that would flop (as had happened with "Loving on Borrowed Time" with Gladys Knight, from the soundtrack for Cobra) and also thought the title was "like a bad porno movie". 

Ienner then approached Jennifer Warnes, who had released a cover of Leonard Cohen songs the previous year. She initially expressed reluctance upon hearing Previte's demo but was persuaded (because of Ienner offering a large sum of money) by her then-boyfriend to take the offer, on the condition that she could sing it with Medley, whom she admired. As a result, after the birth of his daughter, Medley was approached again, this time with Warnes' offer. Medley then agreed to record the track, having also admired her singing, on the condition that he record the song in Los Angeles. 

To give emotional depth to the song, Warnes had a video playback machine and footage of the final scene brought in to synchronize her singing with the movie's ending scene, particularly "the lift". After completing the main vocals, Medley and Warnes were asked by Lloyd to add additional harmonies and flourishes for the song. The song was completed in around one hour. The resulting mix was described as a "Righteous Brothers-type song" by DeNicola.

The song was originally released on July 10, 1987; it was intended to be released alongside the film, but the film's producer Vestron Pictures had moved the American release date to August without notifying RCA Records. Ienner quickly edited the song from the original 6:46 to 4:50 for radio airplay. With the release of the film it became a worldwide hit and is one of the most frequently played songs on radio.

Music video
A music video was produced for this song in October 1987. The video features several couples dancing like in the movie, and it also featured clips from it.

Personnel

Bill Medley - vocals
Jennifer Warnes - lead vocal and additional backing vocals
Gary Herbig - saxophone solo
Laurence Juber - guitar
Dennis Belfield - bass
Paul Leim - drums
Marcy Levy - backing vocals
Produced by Michael Lloyd
Arranged by Gene Page; additional arrangements by Michael Lloyd and John D'Andrea
Recording (at The Village Recorder) and Mix by Carmine Rubino; First engineer: Dan Nebenzal (Second engineer: Jeff DeMorris)
Remixed by Carmine Rubino, Dan Nebenzal, Jimmy Ienner and Michael Lloyd
Published by Knockout Music Inc., Jemava Music Corp., Donald Jay Music and R U Cyrius Music.

Chart performance
In the United States, the single topped the Billboard Hot 100 chart in November 1987 for one week and also reached number one on the Adult Contemporary for four weeks. In the United Kingdom the song had two chart outings: in November 1987, after the film's initial release, the song peaked at No. 6; in January 1991, after the film was shown on mainstream television, the song reached No. 8.

Awards
Academy Award for Best Original Song, 1987
Grammy Award for Best Pop Performance by a Duo or Group with Vocals, 1988
Golden Globe Award for Best Original Song, 1988
ASCAP "Most Performed Songs from Motion Pictures" and "ASCAP Songwriter Of The Year" for its writer.
In 2004 AFI's 100 Years...100 Songs survey placed it #86 among the top tunes in American cinema.

Formats and track listings
7" single
"(I've Had) The Time of My Life" (4:47)
"Love Is Strange" by Mickey & Sylvia (2:52)

12" maxi, CD single, and cassette
"(I've Had) The Time of My Life" (4:47)
"In the Still of the Night" by The Five Satins (2:59)
"Love Is Strange" by Mickey & Sylvia (2:53)
"Overload" by Zappacosta (3:39)

Charts

Weekly charts

Year-end charts

Certifications

}

Other versions
 The Black Eyed Peas' 2010 single "The Time (Dirty Bit)" features interpolations of the song performed by Will.i.am and Fergie.
 In the ninth episode of the second season of Glee, "Special Education", the New Directions performed this song as part of their setlist for Sectionals with featured solos by Quinn Fabray (Dianna Agron) and Sam Evans (Chord Overstreet) with small parts from Mercedes Jones (Amber Riley). It was released as a single from Glee: The Music, Volume 4 and peaked at No. 38 in the Billboard Hot 100.
 One of the writers of the song, John DeNicola, released his own version of "(I've Had) The Time of My Life" on his debut album The Why Because, released in 2019.

See also
List of Hot 100 number-one singles of 1987 (U.S.)
List of number-one adult contemporary singles of 1987 (U.S.)
List of number-one singles in Australia during the 1980s
List of Dutch Top 40 number-one singles of 1988

References

Film theme songs
1987 singles
1987 songs
1980s ballads
1992 singles
Best Original Song Academy Award-winning songs
Best Original Song Golden Globe winning songs
Bill Medley songs
Billboard Hot 100 number-one singles
Cashbox number-one singles
Dutch Top 40 number-one singles
Jennifer Warnes songs
Male–female vocal duets
Number-one singles in Australia
Number-one singles in South Africa
RCA Records singles
RPM Top Singles number-one singles
Song recordings produced by Michael Lloyd
Songs from Dirty Dancing
Songs written by Franke Previte
Songs written by John DeNicola
American soft rock songs